Jill Börresen (born 16 December 1973) is a South African archer. She competed at the 1996 Summer Olympics and the 2000 Summer Olympics.

References

1973 births
Living people
South African female archers
Olympic archers of South Africa
Archers at the 1996 Summer Olympics
Archers at the 2000 Summer Olympics
Sportspeople from Durban
20th-century South African women